Nicholas Restaurant is a chain of three Lebanese restaurants in the Portland metropolitan area, in the United States. It is one of the oldest Lebanese and Middle Eastern restaurants in Portland. The business also operates in Gresham.

History
Nicholas and Linda Dibe opened the first restaurant in 1987. The Dibes fled Beirut, Lebanon in 1982, immigrated to Portland with their four young daughters. Five years later they opened the restaurant. Nicholas invested his entire pension in the restaurant, which first served pizza and calzones. Later, the Dibes started adding some of their favorite Lebanese dishes to the menu, which became popular with customers. The restaurant is now owned by one of the Dibes' daughters, Hilda. There are several locations which are operated by different extended family members. The business also operates in Gresham.

In 2020, Nicholas announced plans to relocate the flagship location to 1109 Southeast Madison Street, in the Buckman neighborhood, in 2021. In April 2021, Nicholas opened its new location which has a full bar.

Reception
Willamette Week Lauren Yoshiko said Nicholas is best for "homestyle hummus and kebabs, every day for decades" and wrote, "If Pioneer Place is Portland's living room, Nicholas is the city's Lebanese kitchen." Nicholas has been recognized in the newspaper's annual "readers' poll", winning in the "Best Mediterranean Restaurant"  category in 2016, 2017, 2018, and 2020.

See also
 List of Lebanese restaurants

References

External links

 

1987 establishments in Oregon
Asian restaurants in Portland, Oregon
Buckman, Portland, Oregon
Gresham, Oregon
Lebanese restaurants
Lebanese-American culture in Oregon
Restaurants established in 1987